Clark Center is an unincorporated community in Clark County, Illinois, United States. Clark Center is located on U.S. Route 40 between Marshall and Martinsville.

References

Unincorporated communities in Clark County, Illinois
Unincorporated communities in Illinois